František Králík (12 April 1942, in Zlín – 7 September 1974, in Hranice) was a Czechoslovak handball player who competed in the 1972 Summer Olympics.

He was part of the Czechoslovak team which won the silver medal at the Munich Games. He played four matches as goalkeeper.

External links
 Profile at Sports-Reference.com

1942 births
1974 deaths
Czech male handball players
Czechoslovak male handball players
Olympic handball players of Czechoslovakia
Handball players at the 1972 Summer Olympics
Olympic silver medalists for Czechoslovakia
Olympic medalists in handball
Medalists at the 1972 Summer Olympics
Sportspeople from Zlín